Think Big may refer to:
 Think Big (film), a 1989 film.
 Think Big, a 1980s New Zealand state economic strategy.
 Think Big (horse), a New Zealand racehorse.
 Think Big (store), a retail establishment that sold oversized versions of common goods.
 Think Big, a children's television program.
 Think Big: Make It Happen In Business and Life, a book by Donald Trump and Bill Zanker
 Think Big: My Adventures in Life and Democracy, 2002 memoir by Preston Manning

See also
 The Magic of Thinking Big